27 (Veintisiete -Twenty seven-) is the second album by Argentine rock band Ciro y los Persas, released in 2012.

Track listing 
 Astros [Stars]
 Caminando [Walking]
 Me gusta [I like it]
 Murgueros [Murgueros]
 Mirenla [Look at she]
 Barón rojo [Red Baron]
 Ciudad animal [Animal city]
 Curtite [Curtite]
 Héroes de Malvinas [Malvinas's heroes]
 La flor en la piedra [The flower in the stone]
 Fácil [Easy]
 Mi Sol [Sun Mine, E G]
 Tal vez [Maybe]
 L.V.R [L.L.R (Long Life to Rock)]

Bonus track
 Tango del Diablo [Devil's tango]

References

External links 
 27 

2012 albums